Jenna Hutchins (born March 25, 2004), is a high school and "Under 20" record-breaking American long distance runner from Johnson City, Tennessee. She ranked within the global top 100 for 5000 metres athletes in 2020.

Early life 
Hutchins lived in Johnson City, but the family also lived just across the border in North Carolina. They moved to Pflugerville, Texas when she was ten years old, staying a few years, after her father got a work promotion. She ran there and doubled as a forward and midfielder in soccer. Hutchins is an accomplished violinist and has volunteered locally as a youth running coach and at the Johnson City Public Library. "She has a great work ethic," said Frankie Nunn, head coach of Tennessee High. She maintained a 4.0 Grade Point Average at the school. In 2021, Hutchins committed to attending Brigham Young University, and was scheduled to start classes in January 2022.

Competition

2015 
Hutchins ran the 3,000 meters twice when she was 11, winning in 11–12-year-old girls in 12:24.5 at the Speedster Cross Country Classic, and  finishing second in the 3K at the South Texas Junior Olympic Championships in 12:13.0.

2019 
Hutchins was named the 2019–2020 Tennessee Girls Cross Country Gatorade Player of the Year, winning the Footlocker South Regional Cross Country Championships in 16:54, She was ranked 9th in the nation at the mile, with a time of 4:43.33, and fifth at two miles, in 10:25.01. 
In December, as a sophomore, Hutchins finished fifth in the Footlocker national cross country championship race.

2020 
In January, she won both the mile and two-mile runs at the Virginia Showcase in Lynchburg. In February, she finished 4th in the Millrose Games indoor mile, setting a state indoor record at 15-years-old. At 16, she took the women's 5000 at the Five & Dime Athletics Meeting in South Carolina with a time of 15:34.47. It was a new (pending) national high school record, and also the new American youth (under 18) best, American junior (under 20) outdoor standard and the North American junior record.  That mark was the fastest girls' U18 time in the world in 2020. Hutchins was selected as Athlete of the Week by USA Track & Field as a result. She also ran the first-ever high school girls' cross-country 5,000 in less than 16 minutes, in Huntsville, Alabama. She was ranked third indoors in the U.S. at 1600m, running 4:48.10, fifth in the mile at 4:45.12, and 5th at 1500m at 4:26.77. Outdoors she ranked first at 3200m, running 9:49.83.

2021 
Before injury shortened her season, Jenna posted nation-leading times in the 1600 (4:44.13) and 3200 meters (9:52.33) and lowered her own Science High 800 meter record to 2:13.65.

Honors and awards 
During her sophomore year in 2018–2019, she won the Tennessee Gatorade Female Track & Field Player of the Year award, earning her the opportunity as a part of Gatorade's "Play it Forward cause marketing platform," to award a $1,000 grant to her choice of a local or national youth sports organization, and duplicated the honors in 2020 and 2021.  In 2019 she earned All-American status for a second straight year at the national Foot Locker Cross Country Championships.,

References

External links 
 Video Jenna Hutchins BREAKS the Girl's Highschool and U20 5k record + Interview 15:34.47

2004 births
Living people
American female middle-distance runners
People from Johnson City, Tennessee
Track and field athletes from Tennessee
21st-century American women